Loughborough Sport   is the brand identity for the sport-related activities and facilities at Loughborough University. The University has a wide variety of facilities covering a range of sports and is host to a number of sports governing bodies.

Facilities
Loughborough Sport maintains several sport complexes on the University's campus in Loughborough.

Gyms
Powerbase and Holywell Park Fitness Centre are the two gyms on the University campus.

Athletics Centre
The Athletics Centre includes the Seb Coe High Performance Athletics Centre and Paula Radcliffe Athletics Track, and is home to events such as the Loughborough International and the Loughborough EAP, and also to Charnwood Athletics Club.

Cricket Centre
The University is home to the National Cricket Performance Centre for the England and Wales Cricket Board (ECB). The Cricket Centre has an indoor training centre and two first class standard pitches.

Loughborough University Stadium
The Stadium was opened in 2012 and is host to Loughborough University FC and Loughborough Foxes.

Events recently hosted at the Stadium include: 
 
UEFA European Under 17 championships
BUCS Super Rugby Showcase games
FA International Tournaments
Venue for Leicester City in the UEFA U19 Champions League
Derby County U23 games

Tennis Centre
The Tennis Centre includes 8 indoor acrylic courts and 3 outdoor clay courts.

In June 2018 the University were awarded a new partnership to be a Lawn Tennis Association National Academy for 14-17 year olds starting in September 2019.

Events hosted include:

AEGON Pro Series
NEC Wheelchair Tennis Masters
ATP 100 Challenger Events

Gymnastics Centre
The Gymnastics Centre has hosted training camps such as the GB World Class performance programme and is home to many local clubs and residential training camps.

Sports Halls
The University has a number of Halls including the Sir David Wallace Sports Hall which has hosted a range of events including:

Loughborough Lightning Netball Super League home games
Preparation Camp for Team GB
BBC East Midlands Sports Awards and Children in Need

Studios
The Studios support a number of sporting activities including martial arts, dance and fencing.

Artificial pitches
There are 5 artificial surfaces covering the sports rugby, football, hockey, lacrosse and American Football. The hockey pitch is the same one from London 2012 and is to be replaced by the surface being used at Tokyo 2020.

National sports partners
The University is a base for several sports governing bodies

British Athletics
British Swimming
British Triathlon
British Weightlifting
ECB
England Netball

References

 
College gymnastics
Sport
University
University swimming in the United Kingdom